"Down and Counting" is a 1986 single by Jamaican-born singer/actress, Claudja Barry.  The single was her most successful on the dance charts peaking at number one for one week.  The single did not chart on the Hot 100 and barely charted on the soul singles chart, stalling at number ninety-eight.

References

1986 singles
Epic Records singles
Hi-NRG songs
1986 songs